Brave is the soundtrack to the 2012 Disney-Pixar film of the same name composed by Patrick Doyle and performed by the London Symphony Orchestra. The soundtrack features Doyle's musical score and features two original songs performed by Scottish singer Julie Fowlis (written by Alex Mandel and Mark Andrews, produced by Jim Sutherland), and one original song performed by Birdy and Mumford & Sons. Walt Disney Records released the soundtrack on both CD album and digital download on June 19, 2012.

Brave was the first Disney film to feature music lyrics in Scottish Gaelic. The lullaby duet between the characters Merida and Queen Elinor entitled "A Mhaighdean Bhan Uasal (Noble Maiden Fair)” (music by Patrick Doyle, lyrics by Patrick Neil Doyle) appears on three occasions in different variations within the fabric of the score, and uniquely includes Gaelic vocals by Emma Thompson and Peigi Barker. Doyle also composed for the film, “Song of Mor’du” (lyrics by Patrick Doyle and Steve Purcell) sung by Billy Connolly, Scott Davies, Patrick Doyle, Gordon Neville, Alex Norton and Carey Wilson. In this drinking song, Doyle and Purcell utilise a rich variety of words in the Scots language.

Doyle's original music for Brave was used in the official trailers for the film, which subsequently featured prominently in the film's score. The trailers also included a Scottish Gaelic song called "Tha Mo Ghaol Air Àird A' Chuain" sung by Julie Fowlis, taken from her album Mar a tha mo chridhe.

Brave is the first Pixar film not to be scored by Randy Newman, Thomas Newman, or Michael Giacchino. The film along with The Good Dinosaur, Onward, Soul, Luca and Turning Red are currently the only Pixar films that are not scored by the three composers. Additionally, with the London Symphony Orchestra performing, this is the first (and only) Pixar film to not be scored in Los Angeles.

Track listing

Charts
Brave debuted as the highest-charting Pixar soundtrack at US Billboard since Cars in 2006. Ratatouille never placed, WALL-E debuted at No. 127 and Cars 2 at No. 153. The soundtracks to Up and Toy Story 3 were only released digitally, instead of being given a traditional CD release, until 2011.

References

External links
 

Patrick Doyle soundtracks
2012 soundtrack albums
2010s film soundtrack albums
Celtic albums
Pixar soundtracks
Walt Disney Records soundtracks
Brave (2012 film)
Fantasy film soundtracks